Czesław Skonieczny (7 July 1894 – 27 March 1946) was a Polish film actor. He appeared in more than 25 films between 1918 and 1941.

Selected filmography
 Uwiedziona (1931)
 Bezimienni bohaterowie (1932)
 Ułani, ułani, chłopcy malowani (1932)
 Każdemu wolno kochać (1933)

References

External links

1894 births
1946 deaths
Polish male film actors
Polish male silent film actors
Male actors from Warsaw
20th-century Polish male actors